Papango may refer to:

Aero Synergie Papango, a French ultralight aircraft
New Zealand scaup, a diving duck, known in the Maori language as the papango